The Franciscan Missionaries of the Divine Motherhood, founded in 1947, is an international congregation of religious sisters that serves in 11 countries, both in the developed and developing world. It serves in various schools, prisons, and hospitals.

History
In 1884 a small group of Franciscan Tertiaries began in Holly Place,  London, helping in the parish. They formed a religious congregation called, "The Missionary Sisters of the Third Order of St Francis for the Home Missions" in 1896. Initially 4 communities spread over 3 dioceses, only two (Littlehampton and Aldershot) remained in 1911. The Aldershot group cared for over 100 orphans.

In 1917, the Aldershot community came under the leadership of Mother Colette, received permission to take postulants. Blanche Spring, later known as Mother Francis, joined the community. In 1925 The first sisters were sent to train as nurses including Sr Francis Spring and in 1935 the first hospital, Mount Alvernia, was opened in Guildford (UK).
Mother Francis Spring was elected Mother General in 1937.  

In 1942, the Missionary Sisters of Saint Francis established their first foundation outside of Britain with a small maternity hospital/nursing home in the Mount Pleasant section of Ballinasloe. John Dignan, Bishop of Clonfert invited them to found a hospital and to that end donated land in the Brackernagh area. In 1945 Portiuncula Hospital opened. 

In 1947, the Congregation was renamed Franciscan Missionaries, of the Divine Motherhood and became a Congregation of Pontifical Right.

Areas of concern
pastoral care in hospitals,
schools and universities
education
prison ministry
parish ministry
aged care
counselling and spiritual direction
health care in bush missions
caring for those afflicted with AIDS
involvement in justice, peace and the care of the environment

References

External links
 Official Website
 Australia
 Singapore and Malaysia
 United Kingdom

Congregations of Franciscan sisters
Franciscan missionary orders
Christian organizations established in 1947
Catholic religious institutes established in the 20th century
Catholic female orders and societies